The 2011 China Baseball League season saw the Tianjin Lions defeat the Guangdong Leopards in 3 games to 1 to win the Championship Series.

Standings

Southeast Division
As of May 11

Southwest Division
As of May 11

Awards

References

External links
Official website Chinese

China Baseball League
2011 in baseball